Martham is a village and civil parish in the English county of Norfolk.

The villages name means 'marten homestead/village' or 'weasel/marten hemmed-in land'.

For the purposes of local government, the parish falls within the district of Great Yarmouth. In recent years the population has expanded with considerable housing being constructed. Bus service to Great Yarmouth is regular. There was a station in the village adjacent to a level crossing on Rollesby Road Martham railway station, but this closed in 1959, when the entire line from Great Yarmouth to North Walsham was eliminated. The station buildings stood for another 30 years.

Education is available in the village from Early Years to aged 16. Martham Primary & Nursery caters for children up to year 6, with Flegg High School taking students from year 7 to year 11. Post 16 education is available at other establishments outside of Martham.

The village has several Georgian houses, a large village green, covering three areas of greensward and two duck ponds. Near St Mary's church Church of England, Ferrygate Lane leads to Martham Ferry, where an unusual floating swing bridge crosses the River Thurne. The bridge leads to Heigham Holmes, an island nature reserve, which can only be accessed by the public on special occasions.  About  to the north of the village is Martham Broad, a  nature reserve, which is not navigable by boat.

The Saxons settled in Martham around AD601 and gave the village its name, "the ham of the martens", the home of the polecats.

The Anglican missionary Anna Hinderer died in the village in 1870.

Notes

External links

.
Information from Genuki Norfolk on Martham.
Martham Parish Council website
Martham Local Weather website
 Martham Primary & Nursery
 Flegg High School
 The History of Martham
http://kepn.nottingham.ac.uk/map/place/Norfolk/Martham

 
Villages in Norfolk
Civil parishes in Norfolk
Borough of Great Yarmouth